Ampullinopsis is an extinct taxonomic genus of deep-water sea snails, marine gastropod molluscs in the clade Sorbeoconcha. These sea snails were epifaunal grazers. Sea snails of this genus lived from Paleocene epoch to Miocene epoch (age range: 48.6 to 20.43 million years ago).

Species 
 Ampullinopsis birmanica Vredenburg 1922
 Ampullinopsis crassatina Lamarck 1804
 Ampullinopsis spenceri Cooke 1919
 Ampullinopsis (Globularia) altivapicana Eames 1952

References
Ampullinopsis in the Paleobiology Database
 Sepkoski, Jack Sepkoski's Online Genus Database
 A. A. Olsson. 1931. Contributions to the Tertiary Paleontology of Northern Peru: Part 4, The Peruvian Oligocene. Bulletins of American Paleontology 17(63) 
 W. P. Woodring. 1959. Geology and paleontology of Canal Zone and adjoining parts of Panama: Description of Tertiary mollusks (gastropods: Vermetidae to Thaididae). United States Geological Survey Professional Paper 306(B):147-239
 M. W. A. Iqbal. 1973. Biostratigraphy of the Tiyon Formation (Middle Eocene) of Sind, Pakistan. Records of the Geological Survey of Pakistan 22:1-40 
 H. S. Ladd. 1977. Cenozoic fossil mollusks from Western Pacific Islands; Gastropods (Eratoidae through Harpidae). United States Geological Survey Professional Paper 533:1-84
 R. Majima. 1989. Cenozoic fossil Naticidae (Mollusca: Gastropoda) in Japan. Bulletins of American Paleontology 96(331):1-159
 J. J. Sepkoski. 2002. A compendium of fossil marine animal genera. Bulletins of American Paleontology 363:1-560
 M. Harzhauser. 2004. Oligocene gastropod faunas for the Eastern Mediterranean (Mesohellenic Trough/Greece and Esfahan-Sirjan Basin/Central Iran). Courier Forschungsinstitut Senckenberg 248:93-181
 M. Harzhauser, M. Euter, W. E. Piller, B. Berning, A. Kroh and O. Mandic. 2009. Oligocene and Early Miocene gastropods from Kutch (NW India) document an early biogeographic switch from Western Tethys to Indo-Pacific. Paläontologische Zeitschrift 83:333-372

Ampullinopsis
Miocene genus extinctions
Paleocene first appearances